Mehdi Salehpour (born August 25, 1975 in Tehran) is an Iranian footballer. He has played for both Esteghlal and Persepolis. He won 2001–02 Hazfi Cup with Esteghlal and played for Persepolis in 2004–05 Iran Pro League.
He also plays for "Honarmandan Team", a team consisted of Iranian actors that plays in Charity matches.

References

External links 

1974 births
Living people
Iranian footballers
Esteghlal F.C. players
Persepolis F.C. players
Paykan F.C. players
Association football forwards